St. Joseph's Cathedral  is the cathedral of the Roman Catholic Diocese of Allahabad, in Prayagraj, India. Built in 1879, the cathedral represents a fine example of Italian architecture. It is said that the craftsmen and materials were brought from Italy.

See also
 All Saints Cathedral
 List of churches in Allahabad

References

Roman Catholic cathedrals in India
Roman Catholic churches in Uttar Pradesh
Tourist attractions in Allahabad
Churches in Allahabad
Cathedrals in Uttar Pradesh